The Mix Tape is a mixtape by American rapper and producer KRS-One. It was released on August 27, 2002 via Koch Records in promotion of the musician's 6th studio album Kristyles the following year. Recording sessions took place at Pride Rock Studios in Los Angeles with additional recording at Salaamin Studios also in Los Angeles. Production was handled by Inebriated Beats, Milann Miles, Rick Long, A-Sharp, BJ Wheeler, Da Beatminerz, Pleasure King and KRS-One himself. It features guest appearances from Kim-O, Kool DJ Red Alert, Priest and Steph Lova.

It is quite short with four interludes making up the 13 tracks. It is known for the song "Ova Here" which disses Nelly, as KRS-One was under the impression Nelly dissed him on the track "#1" from his album Nellyville and the Training Day soundtrack.

A proper but very limited version of the street album was released in Europe under the title Prophets vs. Profits. That version features lesser skits and has a few additional tracks although a pair of tracks on The Mix Tape is missing from Prophets vs. Profits.

Track listing

Personnel
DJ Tiné Tim – engineering, mixing
Harold English – engineering, mixing
G. Simone – executive producer
Jeff Chenault – artwork

Charts

References

External links

KRS-One albums
2002 mixtape albums
Albums produced by KRS-One
Albums produced by Da Beatminerz